The Falconet (in Persian: زنبورک; pronounced: Zænbũræk) is a 1975 Iranian film directed by Farrokh Ghaffari. It stars Parviz Sayyad, Nozar Azadi, Pouri Banayi, Jahangir Forouhar, Enayat Bakhshi, and Shahnaz Tehrani.

Cast
Parviz Sayyad
Pouri Banayi
Nozar Azadi
Enayat Bakhshi
Jahangir Forouhar
Sadegh Bahrami
Mahmoud Bahrami
Bahman Zarrinpour
Hosein Amirfazli
Bagher Sahrarudi

References

Iranian comedy films
1975 films
Films directed by Farrokh Ghaffari